Karate Raja is an Indian actor who has worked in predominantly Tamil-language films. He made his breakthrough as an actor by playing a supporting role in Kamal Haasan's Virumaandi (2004), before garnering acclaim for playing the lead role of Veerappan in the serial Sandhan Kaadu on Makkal TV.

Career 
Natarajan made his breakthrough as an actor with his role in Kamal Haasan's Virumaandi (2004). He was given the name Karate Raja by Haasan. He subsequently appeared in two more popular Tamil films that year, Ghilli (2004) and Vasool Raja MBBS (2004). Raja later appeared in films including Prabhu Deva's Pokkiri (2007) and the horror comedy, Ambuli (2012). He played a notable role in Varnam (2011). He played Kishore's brother in Thiruvambadi Thamban (2012). He played the lead role of K. Chandrashekar Rao in the Telugu-language film Udyama Simham (2019).

On television, Karate Raja notably portrayed the lead role of Veerappan in the serial Sandhana Kaadu on Makkal TV during 2008. The directors spent three years on researching about the life of Veerappan and then spent 110 days in the forest and shoot in Tamil Nadu and Karnataka.

Personal life 
Karate Raja married Divya in July 2009 and has three daughters. In August 2014, Karate Raja filed a complaint to the police that his wife was missing. He later suggested that the pair had marital problems and only lived together for a few days on most months.

Filmography

Television 
 Vidhya No.1 - Manickkam
 Sembaruthi - Maanickam
 Marmadesam - Varma kalai 
student
 Sandhanakaadu - Veerappan

References

External links 

Indian male film actors
Male actors in Tamil cinema
Living people
21st-century Indian male actors
1978 births